Lamorville is a commune in the Meuse department in Grand Est in north-eastern France.

See also
 L'Étanche Abbey, Lorraine, located near the village of Deuxnouds-aux-Bois, on the territory of the commune
 Communes of the Meuse department
 Parc naturel régional de Lorraine

References

Communes of Meuse (department)